Istamgulovo (Iśtamğol) is a rural locality (a village) in Uralsky Selsoviet, Uchalinsky District, Bashkortostan, Russia. The population was 278 as of 2010. There are 8 streets.

Geography 
Istamgulovo is located 39 km southwest of Uchaly (the district's administrative centre) by road. Uralsk is the nearest rural locality.

References 

Rural localities in Uchalinsky District